Imgatuzumab (INN) is a humanized monoclonal antibody designed for the treatment of cancer. It is an anti-EGFR antibody that acts as an immunomodulator.

The drug was developed by Genentech/Roche.

References 

Monoclonal antibodies for tumors